Hillier is a northern suburb of Adelaide, South Australia. It is located in the Town of Gawler.

Geography
Hillier is a western suburb of the Gawler local government area. It is primarily bounded by Angle Vale Road, Wingate Road, the Sturt Highway and the Gawler River.

Demographics

The 2006 Census by the Australian Bureau of Statistics counted 674 persons in Hillier on census night. Of these, 50% were male and 50% were female.

The majority of residents (55.8%) are of Australian birth, with other common census responses being England (31.8%), Scotland (2.1%) and Italy (2.1%).

The age distribution of Hillier residents is skewed higher than the greater Australian population. 86.7% of residents were over 25 years in 2006, compared to the Australian average of 66.5%; and 13.3% were younger than 25 years, compared to the Australian average of 33.5%.

Community
Local newspapers include the News Review Messenger and The Bunyip. Other regional and national newspapers such as The Plains Producer, The Advertiser and The Australian are also available.

Facilities and attractions
Hillier Park caravan park is located on Hillier Road.

Parks
Murray Hillier Reserve is located between Clifford Road and the Gawler River.

Transportation

Roads
Hillier is serviced by Angle Vale Road.

See also
List of Adelaide suburbs

References

External links

Suburbs of Adelaide